Hexthorpe and Balby North is a ward in the metropolitan borough of Doncaster, South Yorkshire, England.  The ward contains three listed buildings that are recorded in the National Heritage List for England.  All the listed buildings are designated at Grade II, the lowest of the three grades, which is applied to "buildings of national importance and special interest".  The ward is a suburb to the west of the centre of Doncaster, and the listed buildings consist of a cemetery chapel, a former Methodist chapel, and a memorial drinking fountain and lamp.


Buildings

References

Citations

Sources

 

Lists of listed buildings in South Yorkshire